Bianca Giovanna Sforza (1482 – 23 November 1496) was an Italian noblewoman, she was the illegitimate daughter, then legitimized of Ludovico Sforza and his lover Bernardina de Corradis, wife of Galeazzo Sanseverino and favorite of Beatrice d'Este.

Early life

In arts and media

Mona Lisa 

Recent historical-artistic studies and confirmed scientific hypotheses have shown that the landscape that is the background to Leonardo da Vinci's Mona Lisa is taken from Bobbio. 
The landscape that forms the background to the picture is that of Bobbio seen from the Malaspina Dal Verme Castle, according to the scientific researcher Carla Glori.
Furthermore, on the basis of these historical-artistic studies, she is identified as Bianca Giovanna Sforza, the girl portrayed in the painting by Leonardo da Vinci.

References

1482 births
1496 deaths
Nobility from Milan
Bianca Giovanna Sforza
15th-century Italian nobility
15th-century Italian women